Oenomaus brulei is a species of butterfly of the family Lycaenidae. It is found in the lowlands of French Guiana.

References

Butterflies described in 2008
Eumaeini
Lycaenidae of South America